Didineis is a genus of wasps in the family Crabronidae. There are more than 20 described species in Didineis.

Species

 Didineis aculeata (Cresson, 1865)
 Didineis bactriana Gussakovskij, 1937
 Didineis barbieri (de Beaumont, 1968)
 Didineis botsharnikovi Gussakovskij, 1937
 Didineis bucharica Gussakovskij, 1937
 Didineis clavimana Gussakovskij, 1937
 Didineis crassicornis Handlirsch, 1888
 Didineis dilata Malloch & Rohwer, 1930
 Didineis hispanica Guichard, 1990
 Didineis latimana Malloch & Rohwer, 1930
 Didineis latro (de Beaumont, 1967)
 Didineis lunicornis (Fabricius, 1798)
 Didineis massaica Pulawski, 2000
 Didineis nigricans Morice, 1911
 Didineis nodosa W. Fox, 1894
 Didineis orientalis Cameron, 1897
 Didineis pannonica Handlirsch, 1888
 Didineis peculiaris W. Fox, 1894
 Didineis sibirica Gussakovskij, 1937
 Didineis stevensi Rohwer, 1923
 Didineis texana (Cresson, 1873)
 Didineis vierecki Rohwer, 1911
 Didineis wuestneii Handlirsch, 1888

References

Crabronidae
Articles created by Qbugbot